Yaakov Yitzchak HaLevi Horowitz, known as "the Seer of Lublin", ha-Chozeh MiLublin; (c. 1745 - August 15, 1815) was a Hasidic rebbe from Poland.

A leading figure in the early Hasidic movement, he became known as the "seer" or "visionary" due to his purported ability to gaze across great distance by supernatural means. He was a disciple of the Maggid of Mezritch. He continued his studies under Shmelke of Nilkolsburg and Elimelech of Lizhensk. He lived for a while in Lantzut before moving to Lublin.

After Horowitz moved to Lublin, thousands of Hasidim flocked to learn from him. Among his disciples were such Hasidic luminaries as Yaakov Yitzchak Rabinowicz ("the Holy Jew"), Simcha Bunim of Peshischa, Meir of Apta,  David of Lelov, Moshe Teitelbaum, Tzvi Elimelech of Dinov, Naftali Zvi of Ropshitz, and Shalom Rokeach of Belz. Horowitz also gained a reputation as a miracle-worker who could accomplish the tikkun, or repair of the soul, of those who sought his assistance and guidance. During his stay in Lublin, Horowitz was opposed by a prominent mitnaged rabbi, Azriel Horowitz. He established his synagogue there at Szeroka 28 in the Jewish Quarter of Lublin. Even after Horowitz's death the synagogue remained the heart and soul for the scholars of the city. During the war the building was demolished to the ground, and was never rebuilt. Lately the Lublin Organization in New York made an attempt to restitute the property in order to rebuild the synagogue in remembrance of Rabbi Horowitz, but their efforts were unsuccessful.

Horowitz was a descendant of Isaiah Horowitz, a prominent rabbi and mystic, and his maternal grandfather, Yaakov Koppel Likover, also a prominent rabbi and scholar, as well as a contemporary of the Ba'al Shem Tov.

He was injured in a fall from a window on Simchat Torah night, following the ritual hakafos dancing, and died almost a year later on Tisha B'av from injuries relating to this fall.  He is buried in the Old Jewish Cemetery, Lublin. His great grandson was Rabbi Kalonymus Kalman Shapira of Piaseczna.

Works
His writings are contained in four books:
Divrei Emet
Zot Zikaron
Zikaron Zot
Zikaron Tov

In a compilation of these works, entitled Torat HaChozeh MiLublin, his commentaries are arranged alphabetically according to topics and according to the weekly Torah portion.

References

1740s births
1815 deaths
Hasidic rebbes
History of Lublin